is a railway station in the city of Hirosaki, Aomori Prefecture, Japan, operated by the private railway operator, Kōnan Railway Company

Lines
Gijukukōkōmae Station is served by the Kōnan Railway Ōwani Line, and lies 6.7 kilometers from the southern terminus of the line at Ōwani Station.

Station layout
The station has a single island platform serving two tracks. The station building is staffed. The station also has a rail yard and maintenance and servicing facilities of the rolling stock of the Kōnan Railway, along with the electrical transformer station that provides power to the Ōwani Line.

Platforms

Adjacent stations

History
Tsugaru-Ōsawa Station was opened on January 26, 1952, with the opening of the Ōwani Line.

Surrounding area
Hakujuen Nursing Homeol

See also
 List of railway stations in Japan

External links

Kōnan Railway home page 
Location map 

Railway stations in Aomori Prefecture
Konan Railway
Hirosaki
Railway stations in Japan opened in 1952